David Nash is a retired professional American basketball player who is most known for his time with the Harlem Globetrotters. Nash finished his collegiate career with the Kansas Jayhawks in 1968 and was drafted in the 4th round of the 1969 NBA Draft by the Chicago Bulls. Due to his length and 6'11" height, he was a natural for the center position. Nash now works as an educator on sleep apnea for the National Library of Medicine.

References 

Living people
Year of birth missing (living people)
Kansas Jayhawks baseball
Harlem Globetrotters players
American health educators